Craig MacGillivray may refer to:

 Craig MacGillivray (footballer) (born 1993), Scottish footballer
 Craig MacGillivray (snooker player) (born 1972), Scottish snooker player